This page examines the forms of taxation levied in India during the Middle Ages.

Ghari
Ghari was a tax on houses. It was introduced by Allauddin Khilji.

Charah
Charah was a tax on grasslands used for grazing of animals. It was also introduced by Allauddin Khilji.

Khiraj
Khiraj was a tax levied on the gross product of lands belonging to non-Muslims. It was introduced by Firoz Shah Tughlaq.

Ushraf
Ushraf was a tax levied on the gross product of lands belonging to Muslims.

Zakat/Sadka

Zakat was a religious tax levied on Muslims. It was kept in the special treasury of Diwan-i-Rasalat headed by kabir-i-Mulk.

Jizya

Jizya was a tax levied on non-Muslims and non-followers of Islam.

Khums
 it is related to war booty collected by one army from its opponent. for example - if an army got 100 rupees from the opponent, it would keep say 80 with itself and would donate the rest in the treasury."

It was introduced by Firuz Tughlaq.

Vijayanagara Empire
In the Vijayanagara Empire, the government department responsible collecting the land revenue was called Athanave. The Vijayanagara emperors collected the taxes based on the soil fertility of lands. It was paid either in the form of crops or money. Heavy taxes were levied on prostitution.

Turkic sultans followed the Hanafi School of Islamic jurisprudence as their monetary policy. The costs were very low in the time of Ibrahim Lodhi. In the Vijayanagar Empire the cost of goods was also low.

ZaribZarib was introduced by Murshid Quli Khan based on the unit bigha. It was collected as one quarter of the crop production. It was paid in any form.

Chauth and Sardeshmukhi

Shivaji collected these taxes outside of his territory. In addition to this, the sardeshmuki was another ten percent tax.

See also 

 Taxation in India

References

History of taxation in India
Medieval India